The trustee model of representation is a model of a representative democracy, frequently contrasted with the delegate model of representation. In this model, constituents elect their representatives as 'trustees' for their constituency. These 'trustees' have autonomy to deliberate and act as they see fit, in their own conscience even if it means going against the explicit desires of their constituents; this is also called a free mandate. By contrast, in the delegate model, the representative is expected to act strictly in accordance with the beliefs of their constituents.

History
This model was formulated by Edmund Burke (1729–1797), an Irish MP and philosopher, who opposed the delegate model of representation. In the trustee model, Burke argued that his behavior in Parliament should be informed by his knowledge and experience, allowing him to serve the public interest. Indeed, as he put it, "his unbiased opinion, his mature judgment, his enlightened conscience, he ought not to sacrifice to you, to any man, or to any set of men living. ... Your representative owes you, not his industry only, but his judgment; and he betrays, instead of serving you, if he sacrifices it to your opinion." Essentially, a trustee considers an issue and, after hearing all sides of the debate, exercises their own judgment in making decisions about what should be done. "You choose a member, indeed; but when you have chosen him, he is not a member of Bristol, but he is a member of Parliament." (Burke, 1774). He made these statements immediately after being elected, and after his colleague had spoken in favour of coercive instructions being given to representatives; Burke failed to be returned at the next election. What is often omitted from discussions of this is that his famous refusal to accept instructions from his Bristol electors was founded on his conscientious objection to voting in Parliament for laws supporting their lucrative slave trade.

John Stuart Mill also championed this model. He stated that while all individuals have a right to be represented, not all political opinions are of equal value. He suggested a model where constituents would receive votes according to their level of education (i.e. people with degrees receiving the most votes, and working-class people receiving the fewest).

See also
Delegate model of representation

References 

Democracy